The 1946 Kentucky Wildcats football team was an American football team that represented the University of Kentucky in the Southeastern Conference (SEC) during the 1946 college football season. In their first season under head coach Bear Bryant, the Wildcats compiled a 7–3 record (2–3 against SEC opponents) and outscored opponents by a total of 233 to 90.

Bryant was hired as Kentucky's head football coach in January 1946. He had been the head coach at Maryland in 1945. At age 32, he was one of the youngest head coaches at a major university. Bryant took over a program that had compiled losing records of 2–8 in 1945, 3–6 in 1944, and 3–6–1 in 1942 – while winning only one game against an SEC opponent during the three years. Bryant promptly turned the program around, eventually leading the Wildcats to SEC and Sugar Bowl championships in 1950.

Two Kentucky players received honors from the Associated Press (AP) or United Press (UP) on the 1946 All-SEC football team: Wallace Jones at end (AP-1, UP-3); and Dan Phelps at halfback (UP-2).

The team played its home games at McLean Stadium in Lexington, Kentucky.

Schedule

1947 NFL Draft

The 1947 NFL Draft was held on December 16, 1946. The following Wildcats were selected.

References

Kentucky
Kentucky Wildcats football seasons
Kentucky Wildcats football